The East Cliff Railway, or East Cliff Lift, is a funicular railway located on the East Cliff of the English seaside resort of Bournemouth. The line serves to link the seaside promenade and beach with the cliff top and the town behind. Following a landslip in April 2016 which damaged the line and associated structures, the railway is out of use indefinitely.

Overview 
The line is owned and operated by Bournemouth, Christchurch and Poole Council and has the following technical parameters:

Technical Parameters 
Length: 
Gradient: 68.9%
Cars: 2
Capacity: 12 passengers per car
Configuration: Double track
Gauge: 
Traction: Electricity

History 
The line was constructed for Bournemouth Corporation, and opened in 1908. It was electrically operated from the start, with winding gear situated at the upper station driven by a  winding motor. The line was controlled by a driver at the upper station, assisted by an attendant at the lower station. Wooden-bodied cars were used. The cars were replaced in the 1960s by aluminium-bodied cars intended to be interchangeable across all three of Bournemouth's surviving cliff railways. In 1987 the track was re-laid, and during the 1990s the line was further upgraded with the installation of an electronic control system.

On 24 April 2016 the lift was damaged by a landslip which occurred when the sandstone layers within the cliff on which the lift rests became saturated with water. The cars were removed from the track by crane on 21 May 2016. The landslip also damaged the lower toll house for the lift and the decision was taken to dismantle the building. The lift has remained closed since the landslip with no firm plans to re-open it as of April 2021.

Further nearby Funiculars 
The East Cliff Railway is one of three such cliff railways in Bournemouth, the other two being the West Cliff Railway and the Fisherman's Walk Cliff Railway. All three operate between April and October.

See also 
 List of funicular railways

References

External links 

 The official council page for the lifts, including prices
 Article on Bournemouth's Cliff Railways from The Heritage Trail web site 
 Article on Bournemouth's Cliff Railways from the Funicular Railways of the UK web site

Transport in Bournemouth
Funicular railways in the United Kingdom
Tourist attractions in Bournemouth
5 ft 6 in gauge railways in England